The Sweden women's national futsal team represents Sweden in international futsal competitions and is controlled by the Swedish Football Association. The team was formed in January 2018 and played its first official matches in April 2018 against Czech Republic.

Tournament records

UEFA Women's Futsal Championship

Matches

2018

2019

2023

All-time team record

Players

Current squad

Notable players
Nazanin Vaseghpanah
Isabel Maria Aguilar

References

External links
 Official page

European women's national futsal teams
W
National team women